The Island Queen was a series of two American sidewheeler steamboats built in 1896 and 1925 respectively. Both vessels were passenger carriers cruising along the Mississippi and Ohio rivers as both an excursion boat and tramp steamer. The first Island Queen burned in 1922 in a fire which destroyed several other vessels. The second Island Queen was destroyed in 1947 when her chief engineer, using a welding torch, accidentally cut into her fuel tank. Island Queen was reduced to her steel frame, and was scrapped by a local company.

First Island Queen

The first Island Queen was a sidewheel excursion wooden hull steamboat built in Cincinnati, Ohio in 1896. She was owned by Coney Island Company and used to ferry passengers between Cincinnati and Coney Island amusement park. She was christened May 16, 1896 by the daughter of Lee H Brooks, Coney Island Company's chairman.

In off-seasons when the park was closed she operated as a tramp steamer on the Mississippi and Ohio rivers, going as far downstream as New Orleans. On April 27, 1922 her forward hurricane deck collapsed, injuring 27 children and paralyzing one. That same year on November 4, Island Queen was severely burned and decommissioned after a fire engulfed several steamboats in Cincinnati harbor.

Second Island Queen

The second Island Queen was built in parts beginning in 1923. Midland Barge Company of Midland, Pennsylvania built her steel hull, designed as a matched pair with the Cincinnati for the Louisville & Cincinnati Packet Company and John W. Hubbard. After taking delivery on the hull and naming it Louisville, the owner instead resold it to the Coney Island Company. Coney Island Company finished the boat in Cincinnati on April 18, 1925. The new Island Queen measured 285-feet long and could carry 4,000 people. The 1000-ton sidewheeler was powered by oil-burning steam engines with six boilers. It was fully completed and christened in Cincinnati by the Coney Island Company on April 18, 1925.
 
Like her predecessor, Island Queen was used for excursions to Coney Island amusement park and tramping between New Orleans, and as far upstream as Pittsburgh, Pennsylvania.

Coney Island Company hired musicians to entertain the passengers. Sidney Desvigne, a coronet player from New Orleans, recruited musicians from his hometown to perform on excursions for the Cincinnati market. In 1929, his band included Henry Julian, Ransom Knowling, Walter "Fats" Pinchon, Percy Servier, and Gene Ware.

While in Pittsburgh, on September 9, 1947, her chief engineer struck her fuel tank with a welding torch, causing a fire and a series of explosions that eventually reduced Island Queen to her steel structure, and killed 19 crew. No passengers were aboard at the time of the fire, but about 40 members of the crew were aboard. Force from the explosions could be felt throughout downtown Pittsburgh, shattering windows in nearby buildings. There were even reports of people being knocked down on streets close to the dock.

References

External links
 Island Queen steamboat The Public Library of Cincinnati and Hamilton County.
 Island Queen (steamboat) Indiana Memory Digital Collections.

Paddle steamers of the United States
Passenger ships of the United States
Steamboats of the Ohio River
Steamboats of the Mississippi River